Redd Hott is the second studio album by American singer Sharon Redd. In October 1982 all the cuts from this LP hit number one on the Hot Dance Club Play chart for one week. Although none of the album's tracks made the Billboard Hot 100, "Beat the Street" made it to number 41 on the Hot R&B/Hip-Hop Songs chart. "Never Give You Up" peaked in the United Kingdom at number 20.

Track listing
Side A
 "Never Give You Up"  –  7:00   
 "You're the One"   – 6:20   
 "Send Your Love"   – 6:57  
Side B 
 "Beat the Street"      – 5:40   
 "In the Name of Love"    – 6:30   
 "Takin' a Chance on Love"    – 5:02   
 "We're Friends Again"     – 4:43

Personnel
Jay Leon – string and horn arrangements
Carole Sylvan, Jocelyn Smith – backing vocals
Eric Matthew – producer
Recorded and mixed at Eric Matthew Studios

Other
Lester Hyatt – clothing
Rory Bernal / Beauty Bookings – hair, make-up 
Celia Sebire – jewelry
Martin Snaric  – stylist coordinator
Linda Edwards – stylist
Trudy Schlachter  – photography
Ruth E. Carson – album coordinator

References

1982 albums
Post-disco EPs